The Tube Bar prank calls are a series of prank calls made in the mid-1970s to the Tube Bar in Jersey City, in which Jim Davidson and John Elmo would ask "Red," the proprietor of the bar, if they could speak to various non-existent customers. The gag names given by the pranksters were puns and homophones for often offensive phrases. Recordings of the calls were circulated widely on duplicated cassette tapes and may have been the inspiration for a long running gag in The Simpsons.

History
In the mid-1970s, two young men—John Elmo and Jim Davidson; later known collectively as Bum Bar Bastards, or The BBB—began calling the Tube Bar located at Journal Square in Jersey City, New Jersey. The bar was owned by heavyweight boxer Louis "Red" Deutsch, and most of the time Deutsch himself answered the calls. During a call, the pranksters would ask Deutsch to call out fictitious, pun-like/homophones names such as "Pepe Roni" (pepperoni), "Hal Ja-Like-a-Kick" (how'd you like a kick), "Phil My-Pockets" (fill my pockets), "Al Coholic" (alcoholic) or "Mike Hunt" (my cunt). Most of the time, Deutsch would call out the names, unaware that he was being subjected to a prank.

At times, Deutsch would catch on, and when he did, he would respond with extreme hostility, shouting profanity, obscene sexual references (usually involving the caller's mother), and threats of physical harm at the caller. He would utter threats such as, "I'll break dem bones on you, on your feet, you'll never be able to walk for the rest of your life!" as well as "I'll cut your belly open and show you all the black stuff you got in there!" Sometimes Red would offer the two pranksters a reward of $100 or $500 if they would show up at his bar in person, but they never took him up on the offer.

By the 1980s, dubbed cassette tapes of the calls were shared between staff of several major league sports teams such as the New York Mets, Los Angeles Dodgers and Miami Dolphins. These dubbed copies of the calls were unofficially referred to as the Red Tapes or Tube Bar Tapes. The popularity of these prank calls spread throughout respective sports leagues, branching out to sports reporters and then into the larger media world.

Bar location and details

The Tube Bar itself was located at 12 Tube Concourse, Jersey City, adjacent to the entrance of the Journal Square PATH station and across the way from the Landmark Loew's Jersey Theatre. The small complex of commercial storefronts that included the Tube Bar was demolished in early 2009 to make way for the 1 Journal Square development project.

Legacy
 Animator and cartoonist Matt Groening has described himself as a fan of the tapes, particularly the "Garden Grove calls". His series The Simpsons features a running joke of Bart Simpson making prank calls to barkeeper Moe Szyslak, asking to speak to patrons with joke names. Groening describes the similarity between these jokes and the Tube Bar calls as "creative synchronicity." Co-developer Sam Simon told The Howard Stern Show in 2007 that the jokes are a "homage to or parody of the classic Red tapes".
 During the 1980s, several different record labels released various edits of the tapes on CD, LP and cassette tape before the Bum Bar Bastards came forward in the 1990s to claim copyright of the tapes and officially release their version.

Discography

See also
 List of practical joke topics

References

External links
 Tube Bar: The Legendary Tube Bar Recording by Mike Walsh

Practical jokes
Culture of Jersey City, New Jersey
Prank calling
Mass media in Hudson County, New Jersey
Prank call albums
1970s in New Jersey
History of Jersey City, New Jersey